Zombicide, is a collaborative adventure board game with a modern zombie theme, created by Guillotine Games.  It was launched on Kickstarter by publisher CoolMiniOrNot and raised $781,597 from 5,258 backers.

In the game, each player controls from one (for 6 players) to four (solo game) "survivors", human beings in a zombie-infested town. In fact, "survivors" hastily change to "hunters" to smash zombies through and through. However, the team must keep the balance between survival and slaughter: as the zombicide's going on, the "danger level" is going up and infected are growing in numbers.

Gameplay 
Each player in the game represents one or more survivors in a zombie apocalypse. Their goal is to complete the scenario objects dictated by their particular mission before being overrun by zombies. The game board represents a zombie-infested town, with large square tiles, laid according to the mission selected.

Before the beginning of the game, a mission is chosen. The playing area is built with board tiles and features (icons representing cars, doors and objectives) according to the selected mission. Each players chooses one or more survivors to play and everyone places their survivors on the starting area of the board.

A deck of zombie cards, which will be used to spawn zombies, is placed on the side of the board. The game starts after the group decides who will be the first player.
In the game, time flows in “turns”, and each turn is composed of three “phases”.

In the first phase, the survivors perform their actions. They can move, attack and interact with inventory items. During their phase, players can trade items, move, kill zombies or perform other tasks to help their objective. They can also discuss strategies to triumph over the zombies. Also each survivor starts the game with a different zombie-fighting special ability. These special abilities grow as the survivor gains experience from defeating zombies and completing objectives during the game. After the first survivor completes their actions, the turn passes to the next survivor.

After each survivor has completed a turn of actions, the second phase begins. This "zombies phase" is completed by moving and attacking survivors with all the zombies on the board. These moves and attacks are programmed by the game mechanics, and are therefore completely predictable.

Finally comes the end phase, when tokens are managed, a new first players is determined, and another turn begins.

Throughout the game, survivors may collect better items and gain experience to help them kill more zombies and accomplish their mission.

If the players are able to complete all objectives, they are winners and may proceed to the following scenario. If, on the other hand, the zombies kill all survivors, the game is lost.

Development 
Zombicide was funded on Kickstarter, with the subsequent franchise funding $34,505,398 combined on Kickstarter as of 2 February 2022.

Products 

The game has been expanded to several settings and spin-off games. All settings and spin-off games feature significantly different mechanics. The game is designed for every product for each setting/spin-off game to be easily mixed, but not to be mixed across settings/spin-offs. Below is a list of all released content for each of the settings and spin-off games, sorted by their SKU.

Modern Zombicide

Fantasy Zombicide

Sci-Fi Zombicide

Night of the Living Dead

Modern Zombicide, 2nd Edition

Western Zombicide

Marvel Zombies

Reception 

TechRaptor stated "The game is fun and challenging if you like cooperative games". An entry from The Encyclopedia of Science Fiction commented on the "complex gameplay" and difficulty. The writer Esther MacCallum-Stewart also praised the digital application that "greatly aids gameplay".

Awards 

2013: As d'Or - Jeu de l'Année - Nominee

2013: Golden Geek Best Thematic Board Game - Nominee

2013: Le Lys Passioné - Finalist

2013: Ludo Award Best Board Game Editor's Choice - Winner

2013: Ludo Award Best Board Game Popular - Winner

2013: Tric Trac - Finalist

Tie-in Fiction

Several media tie-in novels of the game were published by Aconyte Books. The first novel based on the game was Last Resort by Josh Reynolds, followed by Planet Havoc by Tim Waggoner and Age of the Undead by C.L. Werner.

References

External links
 Boardgamegeek entry for Zombicide
 Official page for Zombicide

Board games introduced in 2012
Board games with a modular board
Cooperative board games
Horror board games
Kickstarter-funded tabletop games